The 2008–09 Florida Panthers season was the 16th season for the franchise in the National Hockey League (NHL). The 2008–09 season was also the eighth consecutive season in which the Panthers did not make the Stanley Cup playoffs, finishing level on points with the qualifying Montreal Canadiens, but suffering from an inferior head-to-head record (1–3), the decisive tiebreaker.

On June 14, 2008, the Panthers named Peter DeBoer head coach and signed him to a multi-year contract. Former head coach Jacques Martin had resigned from the position but retained his position as general manager.

Preseason
The Florida Panthers played seven preseason exhibition games before the start of the regular season. The team went on a road trip across North America to play six games on six consecutive nights, winning only the first two games. The trip included the first-ever NHL game played on Prince Edward Island, against the New York Islanders. After one final preseason game at home, the Panthers finished the preseason with a 3–2–2 record.

Regular season

Divisional standings

Conference standings

Schedule and results

Playoffs
The Panthers failed to make the playoffs for the eighth consecutive season.  They last made the playoffs in 2000.

Player statistics

Skaters

Goaltenders

†Denotes player spent time with another team before joining Panthers. Stats reflect time with Panthers only.
‡Traded mid-season
Bold/italics denotes franchise record

Awards and records

Records

Milestones

Transactions

Trades

Free agents

Claimed from waivers

Draft picks
Florida's picks at the 2008 NHL Entry Draft in Ottawa • Ontario.

See also
2008–09 NHL season

Farm teams
The Florida Panthers maintain affiliations with two minor league teams, the Rochester Americans and the Florida Everblades.

References

Florida Panthers seasons
F
F
2008 in sports in Florida
2009 in sports in Florida